GOFAI is an acronym for "Good Old-Fashioned Artificial Intelligence" invented by the philosopher John Haugeland in his 1985 book, Artificial Intelligence: The Very Idea. Technically, GOFAI refers only to a restricted kind of symbolic AI, namely rule-based or logical agents. This approach was popular in the 1980s, especially as an approach to implementing expert systems, but symbolic AI has since been extended in many ways to better handle uncertain reasoning and more open-ended systems. Some of these extensions include probabilistic reasoning, non-monotonic reasoning, multi-agent systems, and neuro-symbolic systems. Significant contributions of symbolic AI, not encompassed by the GOFAI view, include search algorithms; automated planning and scheduling; constraint-based reasoning; the semantic web; ontologies; knowledge graphs; non-monotonic logic; circumscription; automated theorem proving; and symbolic mathematics. For a more complete list, see the main article on symbolic AI.

Symbolic AI after GOFAI and confusions caused by viewing symbolic AI as only GOFAI  

Although the term GOFAI encompasses only a small part of symbolic AI,  prominent in the 1980s, contemporary critics of symbolic AI sometimes use GOFAI as a synonym for it. This conflation of terms can lead to conclusions that symbolic AI research ended in the 1980s and avoided machine learning. Since both conclusions are false and important to correct, we address them below.

The 1980s GOFAI version of symbolic AI characterized by production rules and expert systems  

During the Second AI Summer, i.e., the expert systems boom of the 1980s, production-rule systems requiring knowledge engineering were used to implement expert systems. Knowledge engineering required working with subject matter experts to model task knowledge as rules. At the time, rules were hand-authored by knowledge engineers or the subject matter experts. GOFAI correctly describes this approach. Haugeland and Dreyfus also correctly pointed out various limitations, discussed in later sections.

The Second AI Winter occurred after the expert systems and Lisp Machines markets collapsed. Expert systems did not handle uncertainty well, required more resources to build and maintain than expected, and proved brittle outside their intended domains due to a lack of common-sense reasoning capabilities. Language-specific Lisp machines could become easily replaced by newer workstations with similar performance, obviating their need.

Symbolic AI after GOFAI  

Symbolic AI continued, albeit with reduced funding. It redirected focus to address limitations in handling uncertainty, using statistical AI; and to speed knowledge acquisition, with symbolic approaches to machine learning. Work in semantic networks and knowledge representations led to formalizing ontologies with languages such as RDF and OWL, leading to large ontologies such as YAGO. However, the research and applications of symbolic AI since the Second AI Winter and outside of the production-rule approach to expert systems are less well known and now eclipsed by the media focus on deep learning since 2012.  

For example, research in symbolic AI machine learning includes decision tree learning, Mitchell's version space learning, Valiant's contributions to PAC learning, statistical relational learning, inductive logic programming, and various interactive learning approaches to incorporate user advice, examples, and explanations as an integral part of the learning process.

Problems when current symbolic AI is viewed as GOFAI   

Using GOFAI as a synonym for current symbolic AI leads to erroneous conclusions and confusion. Garcez and Lamb provide an example:Turing award winner Judea Pearl offers a critique of machine learning which, unfortunately, conflates the terms machine learning and deep learning. Similarly, when Geoffrey Hinton refers to symbolic AI, the connotation of the term tends to be that of expert systems dispossessed of any ability to learn. The use of the terminology is in need of clarification. Machine learning is not confined to association rule mining, c.f. the body of work on symbolic ML [machine learning] and relational learning (the differences to deep learning being the choice of representation, localist logical rather than distributed, and the non-use of gradient-based learning algorithms). Equally, symbolic AI is not just about production rules written by hand. A proper definition of AI concerns knowledge representation and reasoning, autonomous multi-agent systems, planning and argumentation, as well as learning.

The key points above are that symbolic AI research has long since moved beyond GOFAI, research continues, and GOFAI no longer describes it. Further, there are symbolic learning approaches to machine learning, such as inductive logic programming and statistical relational learning, i.e., it is not just the domain of deep learning. Below, we return to the philosophical critiques leveled against GOFAI, the symbolic AI approach of the 1980s.

The GOFAI critique of rule-based agents 

GOFAI, the rule-based approach of 1980s symbolic AI, was attacked by philosophers such as Hubert Dreyfus, his brother Stuart Dreyfus, and philosopher Kenneth Sayre. The essence of what they criticized was described earlier by computer scientist Alan Turing, in his 1950 paper Computing Machinery and Intelligence, when he said that "human behavior is far too complex to be captured by any formal set of rules—humans must be using some informal guidelines that … could never be captured in a formal set of rules and thus could never be codified in a computer program." Turing called this "The Argument from Informality of Behaviour."

Russell and Norvig, describe the GOFAI critique in Artificial Intelligence: A Modern Approach:The position they criticize came to be called "Good Old-Fashioned Al," or GOFAI, a term coined by Haugeland (1985). GOFAI is supposed to claim that all intelligent behavior can be captured by a system that reasons logically from a set of facts and rules describing the domain. It therefore corresponds to the simplest logical agent described in Chapter 7. Dreyfus is correct in saying that logical agents are vulnerable to the qualification problem. As we saw in Chapter 13, probabilistic reasoning systems are more appropriate for open-ended domains. The Dreyfus critique therefore is not addressed against computers per se, but rather against one particular way of programming them. It is reasonable to suppose, however, that a book called What First-Order Logical Rule-Based Systems Without Learning Can't Do might have had less impact.In other words, GOFAI restricts its view of agents to those controlled by logical rules. In contrast to this view, symbolic AI also includes non-monotonic logic, modal logic, probabilistic logics, multi-agent systems, symbolic machine learning, and hybrid neuro-symbolic architectures.  Symbolic machine learning, i.e., non-connectionist machine learning specific to symbolic AI, includes inductive logic programming, statistical relational learning, case-based learning, knowledge compilation (chunking), macro-operator learning, learning from analogy, and interactive learning from human advice, explanations, and exemplars.

The GOFAI critique of disembodied agents 

Russell and Norvig do not reject all of Dreyfus’s arguments, they accept his strongest argument, one that applies to all disembodied AIs, whatever their approach:One of Dreyfus's strongest arguments is for situated agents rather than disembodied logical inference engines. An agent whose understanding of "dog" comes only from a limited set of logical sentences such as "Dog(x) ⇒ Mammal(x)" is at a disadvantage compared to an agent that has watched dogs run, has played fetch with them, and has been licked by one. As philosopher Andy Clark (1998) says, "Biological brains are first and foremost the control systems for biological bodies. Biological bodies move and act in rich real-world surroundings: According to Clark, we are "good at frisbee, bad at logic."

The embodied cognition approach claims that it makes no sense to consider the brain separately: cognition takes place within a body, which is embedded in an environment. We need to study the system as a whole; the brain's functioning exploits regularities in its environment, including the rest of its body. Under the embodied cognition approach, robotics, vision, and other sensors become central, not peripheral.

Citations

References 

 
 
 
 
 
 
 
 
 
 
 
 
 
 

zh-yue:GOFAI
Terms in science and technology
Artificial intelligence